Iliamna longisepala, known by the common name long sepal globemallow, is a perennial plant species in the Malvaceae family.

Description
Long haired perennial plant with 5-9 lobed leaves. Flowers in racemes that are pink to lavender. The slightly longer sepal length distinguishes this species from similar looking species like the more common Iliamna rivularis and are around 1.5 cm long.

Distribution
This plant grows at lower elevations from sagebrush desert to Ponderosa pine forests east of the Cascade crest in Washington State, primarily in Chelan and Douglas counties.

References

External links
 Iliamna longisepala- Burke Herbarium Image Collection

Malveae
Flora of the Northwestern United States
Endemic flora of Washington (state)
Flora without expected TNC conservation status